Mac Bryan (born c. 1959) is an American football coach. He was hired on Friday, March 4, 2022 as the head football coach at Lakeview Fort Oglethorpe High School in Fort Oglethorpe, Georgia. Bryan was previously the head football coach at Avery County High School in Newland, North Carolina. Bryan served as the head football coach at Pikeville College—now known as the University of Pikeville—in Pikeville, Kentucky for three seasons, from 2006 to 2008, compiling a record of 10–22. 

Bryan left his previous position as the co-offensive coordinator at the University of Tennessee at Martin to become the head coach at Ooltewah High School.

References

Year of birth missing (living people)
Living people
Chattanooga Mocs football coaches
Lees–McRae Bobcats football coaches
Newberry Wolves football coaches
Pikeville Bears football coaches
Southern Miss Golden Eagles football coaches
UT Martin Skyhawks football coaches
High school football coaches in North Carolina
High school football coaches in South Carolina
High school football coaches in Tennessee
High school football coaches in Georgia (U.S. state)
People from Ooltewah, Tennessee